Eric Tyrone "Ty" Hodges II is an American actor, director, and screenwriter. He is known primarily for his roles in Disney channel films and television shows, including his role as Larry Houdini in Don't Look Under the Bed and Larry Beale in Even Stevens.

Early life
Hodges grew up in Miami, Florida.

Career
At age 16, he appeared as the main character in Janet Jackson's "Go Deep" music video. He appeared as Larry Houdini in the Disney Channel Original Movie Don't Look Under The Bed and in a recurring role as Larry Beale on the Disney Channel series Even Stevens and The Even Stevens Movie.

He starred in MTV's reality show twentyfourseven. Other television credits include Boston Public, Felicity, and NYPD Blue. In 2006,  Hodges appeared alongside Hilary Duff and Haylie Duff in the feature film Material Girls. Other film credits include Holes, The United States of Leland.

He has toured Japan with the musical act Voices United.

Director
Hodges has directed several movies. He directed the 2006 movie Miles from Home starring Meagan Good. He starred in and directed the 2015 film A Girl Like Grace, also starring Meagan Good and Raven-Symoné. He also directed the movie Venus as a Boy starring Olivia Culpo.

Filmography

References

External links
 

Year of birth missing (living people)
African-American male actors
American male television actors
American male film actors
Living people
20th-century American male actors
Place of birth missing (living people)
21st-century American male actors
20th-century African-American people
21st-century African-American people